Fukaya Dam is a rockfill dam located in Gifu Prefecture in Japan. The dam is used for irrigation. The catchment area of the dam is 0.9 km2. The dam impounds about 5  ha of land when full and can store 300 thousand cubic meters of water.

References

Dams in Gifu Prefecture
1973 establishments in Japan